The 1935–36 Chicago Black Hawks season was the team's tenth season in the NHL, and they were coming off a disappointing playoff run in 1935, as the Hawks lost to the Montreal Maroons in the 1st round, scoring no goals in the 2 game series.  Chicago would name Johnny Gottselig as team captain, and would bring back Clem Loughlin as head coach after a successful regular season in 1934–35.  The Hawks would fall to 3rd place in the American Division this season, finishing with a 21–19–8 record for 50 points.  Chicago would actually tie the Boston Bruins and New York Rangers in points, however, would finish behind the Bruins, who had 22 wins in the season, and ahead of the Rangers, who had 19 victories.

Midway through the season, the Black Hawks and New York Rangers would make a trade, as Chicago sent Howie Morenz and Arthur Coulter to New York for Earl Seibert and Glen Brydson.

Paul Thompson would lead the Hawks with 17 goals and 40 points, while Doc Romnes had a team high 25 assists, and would win the Lady Byng Trophy, becoming the 1st Chicago player to win the award.  Mush March would have a very strong season, earning 16 goals and 35 points, along with 42 penalty minutes, while defenseman Alex Levinsky would have a club high 69 penalty minutes.

In goal, the Hawks would go with rookie Mike Karakas, who was known to Chicago fans as he had previously played with the Chicago Shamrocks of the AHA.  Karakas would win 21 games, and post a 1.85, helping the Black Hawks finish 2nd in the league with only 92 goals against.

Chicago would face the New York Americans in the opening round of the playoffs, as the teams would play a 2-game, total goals series.  The Hawks were heavy favorites, as they finished with 12 more points than the Americans in the regular season.  New York would jump out with a 3–0 victory in the 1st game, and the 3 goal difference was too much for the Black Hawks to overcome, as they defeated the Americans in the 2nd game 5–4, however, would lose the series by a 7–5 score.

Season standings

Record vs. opponents

Schedule and results

Regular season

Playoffs

New York Americans 7, Chicago Black Hawks 5

Player statistics

Scoring leaders

Goaltending

Playoffs statistics

Scoring leaders

Goaltending

References

SHRP Sports
The Internet Hockey Database
National Hockey League Guide & Record Book 2007

Chicago Blackhawks seasons
Chicago
Chicago